Gorkin may refer to:
Gorkin, a village in Iran
Alexander Gorkin, Soviet politician
Julián Gorkin (1901–1987), Spanish revolutionary socialist
Pamela Gorkin, American mathematician